Esther Baron (born 6 February 1987) is a retired French swimmer. She had her best achievements in the 200 m backstroke event: gold medals in the European Championships of 2006, long course and short course, silver medal at the 2007 European Short Course Swimming Championships and fourth place at the 2007 World Aquatics Championships. While winning the short course championship in 2006 she set a new European record.

She retired from competitions in September 2009. After obtaining a diploma of sport educator she worked as a swimming coach for children at SP Manosque, the club where she learned swimming herself. She is also involved in local politics with the party of Christophe Castaner in Alpes-de-Haute-Provence.

References

1987 births
Living people
French female backstroke swimmers
European Aquatics Championships medalists in swimming
Mediterranean Games silver medalists for France
Mediterranean Games medalists in swimming
Swimmers at the 2005 Mediterranean Games
Deputies of the 14th National Assembly of the French Fifth Republic
21st-century French women